Guwdah    is a village in Hormozgan Province in the south of Iran.

Guwdah the Beg village from Central District in the  city of Bastak (Bastak County شهرستان بستک) Hormozgan Province.

See also 

Kookherd
Bastak 
Bandar Abbas
Morbagh
Bandar Lengeh
Hormozgān  
Larestan
Lar, Iran
Evaz
Morbagh
Bandar Abbas
Fareghan
Ravidar
Kish Island
AL madani
Maghoh
Chale Kookherd

References

External links 
  .

Populated places in Hormozgan Province
Bastak County